Tommaso Domini (born 18 August 1989) is an Italian football midfielder. He played for Gubbio in the 2014–15 Lega Pro.

Biography
Born in Cesena, Romagna region, Domini spent 6 seasons in non-professional clubs, mainly in Serie D and Eccellenza Emilia–Romagna.

Parma
In July 2013 Domini was signed by Serie A club Parma F.C., but immediately farmed to Lega Pro Prima Divisione club Gubbio. Gubbio also received premi di valorizzazione of €100,000.

On 16 July 2014 the loan was renewed. Gubbio also signed Bentoglio, Casiraghi, Luparini and Manganelli on the same day.

References

Italian footballers
A.S. Gubbio 1910 players
Serie C players
Association football midfielders
People from Cesena
Footballers from Emilia-Romagna
1989 births
Living people
Sportspeople from the Province of Forlì-Cesena